Beat My Distance is the debut studio album by Canadian band Anemone. It was released on February 15, 2019, through Luminelle Records.

Track listing

References

2019 debut albums
Anemone (band) albums